This is a list of electrical generating stations in British Columbia, Canada.

Hydroelectric 

List of most of the hydroelectric generating stations in British Columbia.

Hydroelectric stations owned by BC Hydro 

A list of all grid-tied hydroelectric generation stations in British Columbia operated by BC Hydro

Hydroelectric stations with partial BC Hydro ownership 

Waneta Dam has been wholly owned by BC Hydro since July 2018  after Fortis BC finalized an agreement with Teck to sell its 66% interest in the dam, but BC Hydro had first rights to purchase the remaining 66% from its first 1/3 ownership deal.

Privately-owned hydroelectric stations 
This list includes all grid-connected hydroelectric generating stations not owned by the Crown Corporation BC Hydro. This list includes stations owned and operated by Independent Power Producers as well as by private utilities such as Nelson Hydro and FortisBC. In some cases, such as Lois Lake and Powell Lake, the electricity generated may be used solely for private industry, even if it is grid-connected.

Other renewables

Biomass, biogas and waste heat 
List of all biomass, biogas and waste heat power plants in British Columbia.

Solar photovoltaic 
List of all solar photovoltaic power stations in British Columbia.

Wind 

List of all wind farms in British Columbia.

Natural gas 
List of all natural gas power plants in British Columbia.

Off-grid 
List of all power plants in British Columbia serving loads in communities not connected to the North American power grid.

See also 

 BC Hydro
 Columbia Power Corporation
 FortisBC
 Energy in Canada
 Independent power producers in British Columbia
 List of electrical generating stations in Canada

References

External links
 Hydroelectric Plants in - British Columbia
 Dams Of The Columbia Basin	

Lists of power stations in Canada
Hydroelectric power stations in British Columbia